Katarzyna (Kasia) Nosowska (born 30 August 1971, Szczecin) is the lead singer of the Polish rock band Hey. She is also known for her solo career, which in contrast to Hey's guitar-driven rock delves more into electronica. Apart from penning Hey's lyrics, she is also a columnist in several Polish magazines.

She received many awards and holds the record for the largest number of Fryderyk awards, including multiple wins in categories Author of the Year and Female Vocalist of the Year. In 2012 and 2013, she was the art director of concert tour Męskie Granie.

Discography

Solo albums

Awards and nominations

Fryderyk
Fryderyk awards received by Kasia Nosowska and her band Hey

References

External links
nosowska.pl
Katarzyna Nosowska  at culture.pl

1971 births
Living people
Women rock singers
Musicians from Szczecin
Polish pop singers
Polish rock singers
Polish radio journalists
English-language singers from Poland
Polish lyricists
21st-century Polish women singers
21st-century Polish singers